Stef Dawson is an Australian actress. She portrayed Annie Cresta in The Hunger Games: Mockingjay – Part 1 and Part 2. She also made a cameo appearance in The Hunger Games: Catching Fire.

Personal life
Dawson was born in Canberra, Australian Capital Territory and attended the Canberra Girls' Grammar School, Radford College, and Screenwise Film & TV School. She also studied theatre and opera at the University of Wollongong.

Career
Dawson performed in many plays at Short and Sweet in Sydney from 2007 to 2009. She made her first short film role as the lead in Chocolates. Later, she landed the lead role as the title character in the short film Ophelia and also, received a role in The Consulate as Sarah Rael. She landed a role in All Saints as Tully McIntyre; where she made her television debut in the episode, "The Blink of an Eye". Dawson made another television appearance in Out of Blue as a guest role, and in Swift and Shift Couriers as Kylie Brown  in the episode "The Polar Bear Suit". Dawson then landed her first lead in an Australian feature film playing Leah Thompson, in Wrath. Dawson made a film appearance in Foxfur as Pearlwing.

Dawson portrayed Annie Cresta in The Hunger Games: Mockingjay – Part 1 and The Hunger Games: Mockingjay – Part 2. She also made a brief appearance in The Hunger Games: Catching Fire. Dawson next appeared in the microbudget film Creedmoria, which premiered at the 2016 Cinequest Film Festival in San Jose, California.

Filmography

Film

Television

References

External links

Living people
Actresses from Canberra
Australian film actresses
Australian television actresses
21st-century Australian actresses
University of Wollongong alumni
1988 births